Rome's National Museum of Oriental Art "Giuseppe Tucci" (Italian: Museo Nazionale d'Arte Orientale 'Giuseppe Tucci' ) is a museum (now closed) in Rome, Italy, that was dedicated to the arts of the Orient, from the Middle East to Japan. The museum was located in Via Merulana 248 in the Rione Esquilino.

History
It was founded in 1957 and closed in 2017, when its collections were transferred to the Pigorini National Museum of Prehistory and Ethnography in the city's southern EUR suburb.

Collection
The museum was founded upon a collection of art objects from Nepal, Tibet and Ladakh that Giuseppe Tucci had acquired during his travels in 1928–1948. Later acquisitions included a notable group of artifacts from the Gandhara area, that had been acquired from the archaeological missions of the Italian Institute for Middle and Far East (IsMEO) to the Buddhist and protohistoric sites of Swat, namely the Butkara Stupa, Barikot, Panr, and Aligrama among others. Other holdings include items from the Palace of Mas'ud III and the Buddhist shrine of Tape Sardar at Ghazni, Afghanistan, and the prehistoric city of Shahr-e Sokhteh, in eastern Iran.

See also
 Italian Institute for Africa and the Orient

References

Il Museo Nazionale d'Arte Orientale a Palazzo Brancaccio, Livorno, Sillabe, 1997.
C. Delvecchio, "Civiltà lontane al Museo Nazionale d'Arte Orientale", Lazio ieri e oggi, a. XLII, 4, 2006, pp. 124–127.

External links

Art museums and galleries in Rome
Museums in Rome
Archaeological museums in Italy
National museums of Italy
Asian art museums in Italy